The twelfth series of the British medical drama television series Casualty commenced airing in the United Kingdom on BBC One on 11 September 1997 and finished on 28 February 1998. The first episode was originally due to be shown on the evening of Saturday 6 September, but this was delayed until the following Thursday due to coverage of the Funeral of Diana, Princess of Wales earlier on that day, as the BBC felt it would be inappropriate to air the episode so soon after such an event. 

This series was notable as two of the episodes (episodes 1 and 17) had an extended 'feature-length' running time of 75 minutes, compared to the standard episode length of 50 minutes. Episode 17, "The Golden Hour", aired on 27 December 1997, featured a multiple motorway pile-up. The series also featured the first official two-part story, Everlasting Love, which played out over episodes 25 and 26.

Cast

Overview
The twelfth series of Casualty features a cast of characters working in the emergency department of Holby City Hospital. The series began with 8 roles with star billing, with a number of cast changes following the departures of several characters at the end of the previous series. Peter Birch and Julia Watson starred as emergency medicine consultants Jack Hathaway and Barbara "Baz" Hayes. Gray O'Brien appeared as senior house officer Richard McCaig. Derek Thompson continued his role as charge nurse Charlie Fairhead while Sorcha Cusack portrayed sister Kate Wilson. Jonathan Kerrigan appeared as staff nurse Sam Colloby. Ian Bleasdale and Sue Devaney starred as paramedics Josh Griffiths and Liz Harker. Soo Drouet continued her recurring role as Monica, an anaesthetist, until episode three. 

The series' opening episode saw the introduction of six new characters: general manager Elliot Matthews (Peter Guinness); senior house officer Georgina "George" Woodman (Rebecca Lacey); senior staff nurse Mark Grace (Paterson Joseph); staff nurse Tina Seabrook (Claire Goose); receptionist Amy Howard (Rebecca Wheatley); and porter Derek "Sunny" Sunderland (Vincenzo Pellegrino). Barbara Marten also joined the cast in episode thirteen as senior staff nurse (later, sister) Eve Montgomery. Donna Alexander returned to the cast as paramedic Penny Hutchens, now a regular cast member following guest appearances in the previous series. Patrick Robinson, Brenda Fricker, Cathy Shipton and Clive Mantle reprised their roles as Martin "Ash" Ashford, Megan Roach, Lisa "Duffy" Duffin and Mike Barratt for the two-part season finale which saw Charlie and Baz marry. Six cast members departed throughout this series: Cusack, Birch and Devaney departed in episodes ten, eleven and twelve respectively; and Watson, O'Brien and Guinness left at the conclusion of the series.

Main characters 
Donna Alexander as Penny Hutchens (from episode 1)
Peter Birch as Jack Hathaway (until episode 11)
Ian Bleasdale as Josh Griffiths
Sorcha Cusack as Kate Wilson (until episode 10)
Sue Devaney as Liz Harker (until episode 12)
Claire Goose as Tina Seabrook (from episode 1)
Peter Guinness as Elliot Matthews (episodes 1−26)
Paterson Joseph as Mark Grace (from episode 1)
Jonathan Kerrigan as Sam Colloby
Rebecca Lacey as Georgina "George" Woodman (from episode 1)
Barbara Marten as Eve Montgomery (from episode 13)
Gray O'Brien as Richard McCaig (until episode 26)
Vincenzo Pellegrino as Derek "Sunny" Sunderland (from episode 1)
Derek Thompson as Charlie Fairhead
Julia Watson as Barbara "Baz" Hayes (until episode 26)
Rebecca Wheatley as Amy Howard (from episode 1)

Recurring and guest characters 
Soo Drouet as Monica (until episode 3)
Brenda Fricker as Megan Roach (episodes 25−26)
Clive Mantle as Mike Barratt (episodes 25−26)
Joseph May as Paul (episodes 3−17)
Tim Perrin as Keith Merrick (episodes 21−26)
Patrick Robinson as Martin "Ash" Ashford (episodes 25−26)
Cathy Shipton as Lisa "Duffy" Duffin (episodes 25−26)

Episodes

References

External links
 Casualty series 12 at the Internet Movie Database

12
1997 British television seasons
1998 British television seasons